Harold W. "Bud" Lawson (1937–2019) was a software engineer, computer architect and systems engineer. Lawson is credited with the 1964 invention of the pointer  in high-level programming languages (with "a lot of comments" from Donald Knuth and Douglas McIlroy). In 2000, Lawson was presented the Computer Pioneer Award by the IEEE for his invention.

In July, 2010 he published a new book entitled A Journey Through the Systems Landscape with College Publications. The book provides a comprehensive discipline-independent approach to learning to "think" and "act" in terms of systems.

Amongst several academic appointments, his last position was as Professor of Telecommunications and Computer Systems at Linköping University where he co-founded its Department of Computer and Information Science in 1983.

He is a Fellow of ACM, Fellow and Life Member of the IEEE, and Fellow of the International Council on Systems Engineering INCOSE IEEE Charles Babbage Computer Pioneer and INCOSE Systems Engineering Pioneer.

Bud died in Stockholm on June 10, 2019, after a period of illness.

References 
6. Alvaro Videla. Kateryna L. Yushchenko — Inventor of Pointers (Dec 8, 2018). A Computer of One's Own Pioneers of the Computing Age https://medium.com/a-computer-of-ones-own/kateryna-l-yushchenko-inventor-of-pointers-6f2796fa1798

1937 births
2019 deaths
American computer scientists
American software engineers
American emigrants to Sweden
Academic staff of Linköping University